St Paul's Collegiate School is a private (independent) Anglican secondary school in Hamilton, New Zealand. Opened in 1959 originally as a boys only school, the school began admitting girls in years 12 to 13 in 1985, then girls in years 11 to 13 in 2010.

St Paul's Collegiate was founded by the Anglican community including the parents of some Southwell School students, but today only a small proportion of St Pauls students are former Southwell students.

The school is located on land that previously was a part of the farm known as Cherrybrook which belonged to Mr. Andrew Primrose, Esq., J.P. an early settler and prominent resident in Waikato. The land purchased by Primrose was previously confiscated from Māori by the Grey Colonial government.

The school also owns and operates Tihoi Venture School, located on the edge of the Pureora Forest Park around 50 km west of Taupo. Year 10 students attend Tihoi for two terms (18 weeks) as part of an adventure-based character development and education programme.

The school won the Maadi Cup and Springbok Shield in 2002 and 2003 for rowing.

Enrolment
As a private school, St Paul's Collegiate receives little funding from the government and charges parents of students tuition fees to cover costs. As of 2014, the school fees are approximately NZ$19,050 per year for day students and NZ$29,800 for boarders. The exception is in Year 10 with the 18 weeks at Tihoi Venture School, where the fees are NZ$25,170 for day students and NZ$30.400 for boarders. Fees for international students are higher.

At the March 2012 Education Review Office (ERO) review of the school, St Paul's Collegiate had 675 students, including 31 international students. The school's gender composition was 85% male and 15% female, or 72% male and 28% female once the boys-only Years 9 and 10 are excluded. Around 71% of students at the school identified as New Zealand European (Pakeha), 9% as Maori, and 5% each as Chinese, Indian, and Pacific Islanders.

Houses
The school has eight school houses: four for day boys, three for boarding boys, and one for girls.

Notable alumni
 Dan Ammann - President of General Motors
 Rod Carr - Vice Chancellor of Canterbury University 
 James Dallinger - member of New Zealand rowing crew, Beijing Olympics 2008
 Paul Gerritsen - member of New Zealand rowing crew
 Geoff Hines - All Black
 Lance Hohaia - member of the New Zealand Warriors Rugby League Team
 Peter Latham - cyclist
 Toby Lynn - rugby player, Waikato Chiefs
 Samisoni Taukei'aho - All Black
 Sam Uffindell, Member of Parliament (also attended King's College)
 Simon Upton - former Cabinet Minister
 Daniel Vettori - member of New Zealand cricket team
 Jeremy Wells - TV personality (also attended Wanganui Collegiate School)
 Olivia Wensley - Women's Rights Activist and CEO. 
 Chris Wood - All Whites footballer
 Gideon Wrampling - New Zealand Schoolboys, New Zealand under-20 and Waikato Chiefs rugby player.

References

External links
School website
Education Review Office (ERO) reports

Boarding schools in New Zealand
Educational institutions established in 1958
Secondary schools in Hamilton, New Zealand
Anglican schools in New Zealand
1958 establishments in New Zealand